Prostanthera galbraithiae, commonly known as Wellington mint-bush, is a species of flowering plant in the family Lamiaceae and is endemic to Victoria in Australia. It is an erect or spreading shrub with densely hairy branches that are more or less square in cross-section, narrow egg-shaped or oblong leaves with the edges rolled under, and deep mauve to purple flowers with maroon dots inside the petal tube.

Description
Flowering occurs from September to October.

Taxonomy
Prostanthera galbraithiae was first formally described by botanist Barry Conn in 1998 in the journal Telopea. The specific epithet is named for Jean Galbraith, a member of the Latrobe Valley Field Naturalists, who co-discovered the species and advocated for its protection.

Distribution and habitat
Wellington mint-bush occurs on sandy soils over clay on the Gippsland plains in Holey Plains State Park. It is associated with Eucalyptus obliqua woodland with a heathy understorey including species such as Acacia oxycedrus, Epacris impressa, Lepidosperma concavum, Leptospermum myrsinoides and Platylobium obtusangulum. It can become locally common after fire. However, a population at Dutson Downs appears to have become extinct due to overly-frequent fires.

Conservation status
This species is classified as "vulnerable" under the Australian Government Environment Protection and Biodiversity Conservation Act 1999. The main threats to the species include inappropriate fire regimes, firebreak maintenance, herbicide use and competition from bracken fern Pteridium esculentum.

References

galbraithiae
Flora of Victoria (Australia)
Lamiales of Australia
Taxa named by Barry John Conn
Plants described in 1998